The Institute for Advanced Judaic Studies is a Canadian Orthodox Jewish yeshiva. It is accredited by the Ontario Ministry of Education as a private university and has sovereignty to award bachelor's, master's, and doctorate degrees in Talmudic law and Judaic studies.

History
In 1970 a group of ten families from the BMG Institute for Advanced Learning of Lakewood, New Jersey moved to Toronto and founded the Toronto Kollel. The founders include Rav Shlomo Eliyahu Miller, the Rosh Kollel of the Kollel Avreichim Institute for Advanced Judaic Studies in Toronto, and head of its Beis Din (rabbinical court) and Rav Yaakov Hirschman.

Known previously as the Institute for Advanced Talmudic Study - Kollel Avreichim, it was incorporated by letters patent dated October 9, 1970, as an institution of higher learning in theology, religious education, scholarship, and research. 
.

Mission
 to provide post-secondary training programs in religious education and research in higher Jewish learning for rabbis, teachers, and educators;
 to develop the devotional and spiritual life of its students;
 to encourage its students to develop a mastery of the content of the Bible, Judaic theology, Talmudic law, and legal codes.

Facility
The building houses the 3,000-square-foot Bais Medrash, classrooms, three book libraries, a CD library, two computer online libraries, the Bar Ilan computer resource library, the Kol Halashon online Lecture library, meeting rooms, a kitchen, and a dining room.

The Ladies Auxiliary maintains the Weinstock Memorial Library which is open to the public and runs a series of community lectures.

The New Campus 
During the 50th Anniversary Dinner (which took place on November 28, 2022, at The Embassy Grand Convention Center), The Chairman Mr. Ben Friedman Toronto, announced the purchase of a new apartment building located on Fraserwood Avenue, which will be named The Shimon Stern Residence. The new building will allow the institution to expand their scholars base and host new families who will join the Kollel in the future. In addition, Mr. Ben Friedman also presented a 3d rendering of the new Bais Medrash to be built on Coldstream Avenue. The new building will have more study halls, plenty of parking and a state of the art library.

Kollel Toronto
Kollel Toronto is an institution of learning consisting of a core group of scholars who are engaged in full-time Torah study at an advanced level—headed by Roshei Kollel, Rav Shlomo Miller שליט"א* and Rav Yaakov Hirschman שליט"א.

(שליט"א is pronounced "shehletah"; it is an acronym for שיחיה לימים טובים ארוכים, literally that he should live to good long days; used as an honorific after a living rabbi's name.)

Programs
 diplomas and certificates 
 Bachelor of Judaics
 Bachelor of Talmudic Law (BTL)
 Master of Judaics
 Master of Talmudic Law
 Doctor of Philosophy in Judaics
 Doctor of Philosophy in Talmudic Law

Notable alumni

Rabbis in Toronto 

 Rabbi Yacov Shalom Felder, Rabbi of Shomrei Shabbos Synagogue
 Rabbi Mordechai Kanner, Cong. Heichal Kol Yaakov
 Rabbi Uri Kaufman, Cong. Aguda South Anshe Kielce
 Rabbi Chaim Dovid Kulik, Cong. Zichron Yitzchok
 Rabbi Mitch Mandel, Director of Ohr Somayach, Jerusalem Toronto
 Rabbi David Pam, Cong. Zichron Shneur
 Rabbi Mordechai Scheiner, Beth Avraham Yoseph of Toronto
 Rabbi Rafael Shmulewitz, Tiferes Bais Yaakov
 Rabbi Yehuda Oppenheimer, Marlee Ave. Shul
 Rabbi Aberbach, New York
 Rabbi Blitz, Detroit, MI
 Rabbi Davis, Founder of Yeshiva Gedola of Passaic
 Rabbi Drillman, New York
 Rabbi Fishman, Principal of Hebrew Academy of Cleveland
 Rabbi Frankel, New York
 Rabbi Fuerst, Lakewood, NJ
 Rabbi Glezerman, Lakewood, NJ
 Rabbi Gordon, New York
 Rabbi Herskowitz, Lakewood, NJ
 Rabbi Horowitz, Kiryat Sefer, Israel
 Rabbi Jundef, Lakewood, NJ
 Rabbi Kovitz, New York
 Rabbi Kraminer, New York
 Rabbi Kupfer, Executive Director of Gindi Maimonides Academy Los Angeles
 Rabbi Marcus, Buffalo, New York List of Young Israel Synagogues#:~:text=Rabbi Eliezer Marcus
 Rabbi Muller, Kollel Avrohom Dovid, Monsey, NY
 Rabbi Nojovits, Lakewood, NJ
 Rabbi Plotnik, Bais Yaakov Lakewood
 Rabbi Rosen, Southfield, Michigan
 Rabbi Rubin, Queens, New York
 Rabbi Strassfeld, Englewood, NJ
 Rabbi Sauer, New York
 Rabbi Sekula, Lakewood, NJ
 Rabbi Tanenbaum, Seattle, Washington
 Rabbi Weissman, Bene Berak, Israel
 Rabbi Weinberg, New York
 Rabbi Zuckerman, Detroit, MI

References

External links

Education in Toronto
Orthodox yeshivas in Canada
Universities and colleges in Toronto
Private universities and colleges in Canada
1997 establishments in Ontario
Educational institutions established in 1997